Conspiracy (Spanish:Conspiración) is a 1927 Mexican silent drama film directed by Manuel R. Ojeda.

Cast
 Pedro Oscar Alatriste 
 Eva de la Fuente 
 Enrique del Campo 
 Conchita del Hoyo 
 Godofredo Kun 
 Max Langler 
 Luis Marquez   
 Taina Niki 
 Guillermo Olaya 
 Alfonso Parra 
 Ramón Pereda 
 Quinto Simidoni 
 Tania Tamanova 
 Julio Webber
 Dolores Yustis

References

Bibliography
 Federico Dávalos Orozco & Esperanza Vázquez Bernal. Filmografía General Del Cine Mexicano, 1906-1931. Universidad Autónoma de Puebla, 1985.

External links 
 

1927 films
1927 drama films
Mexican drama films
Mexican silent films
1920s Spanish-language films
Films directed by Manuel R. Ojeda
Mexican black-and-white films
Silent drama films